Athletics events at the 2002 South American Games were held at the Estádio Olímpico do Pará in Belém, Brazil, between August 1–3, 2002.  For the first time, the tournament was restricted to junior athletes (U-20).  The results were used to determine the medals awarded for this year's South American Junior Championships.

A total of 44 events were contested, 22 by men and 22 by women.

Medal summary

Medal winners were published in a book written by Argentinian journalist Ernesto Rodríguez III with support of the Argentine Olympic Committee (Spanish: Comité Olímpico Argentino) under the auspices of the Ministry of Education (Spanish: Ministerio de Educación de la Nación) in collaboration with the Office of Sports (Spanish: Secretaría de Deporte de la Nación).  Eduardo Biscayart supplied the list of winners and their results.  Further results are published for the South American Junior
Championships (Netherlands Antilles unregarded). Churandy Martina's results are collected elsewhere.

Results that are identical to the South American Junior Championships are shown
elsewhere.
Here, only those results are displayed that are different.

Further events with low participation (only 4 athletes from 3 countries) are
men's High jump and Javelin throw, and women's 3000 metres steeplechase, Shot
put, and Heptathlon.  However, there is no indication for awarding a
reduced number of medals.

Men
Other results of the men's events are shown
elsewhere.

Note
†: No medal because of lack of minimum participation.

Women

Other results of the women's events are shown
elsewhere.

Note
†: No medal because of lack of minimum participation.

Doping

Doping offences during the athletics events of the games are documented elsewhere.

Medal table (unofficial)

An unofficial medal count for the athletics events at South American Games is
shown below. This medal table differs from the
medal
table published for the South American Under-23 Championships because of
different number of nations, and the minimum participation
necessary to award a full set of medals as introduced by ODESUR.  Affected are the medal counts for Brazil, Chile, and the Netherlands Antilles.

References

2002
South American Games
2002 in Brazilian sport
International athletics competitions hosted by Brazil
Athletics